George Tod (1880–1930) was a Scottish footballer who played in the Football League for Preston North End.

References

1880 births
1930 deaths
Scottish footballers
English Football League players
Association football midfielders
Linthouse F.C. players
Preston North End F.C. players
Grimsby Town F.C. players